The Iceland national junior handball team is the national under-21 handball team of Iceland. Controlled by the Icelandic Handball Association, it represents Iceland in international matches. In 1993, the team has achieved their best performance when they finished third in the 1993 Men's Junior World Handball Championship.

Statistics

IHF Junior World Championship record
 Champions   Runners up   Third place   Fourth place

EHF European Junior Championship 
 Champions   Runners up   Third place   Fourth place

References

External links
Official site
World Men's Youth Championship table
European Men's Youth Championship table

Handball in Iceland
Men's national junior handball teams
Handball